Cattleya hoehnei, commonly known by the synonym Laelia mixta, is a species of orchid endemic to Espírito Santo, Brazil. It has been renamed as Cattleya hoehnei Van den Berg (2008).

References

External links 

hoehnei
Endemic orchids of Brazil
Orchids of Espírito Santo